Chembarathipoo is a 2017 Indian Malayalam-language film directed by Arun Vaiga. The film features debutants Askar Ali and Aditi Ravi in lead roles.

Plot
Vinod, a young guy who is nursing a broken heart after a failed first love is helped by his friends to recover from despair, only to fall head over heels in love with another girl.

Cast	
 Askar Ali as Vinod Sashi
 Aditi Ravi as Diya
 Parvathy Arun as Neena Jacob
 Vishak Nair
 Sunil Sukhada
 Aju Varghese as Mathai
 Dharmajan Bolgatty as Adipoli Ratheesh
 Sudheer Karamana
 Pradeep Kottayam
 Vijilesh
 Dinesh Nair
 Dain Davis as Vinod's friend (uncredited role)

References

External links
 

2017 films
Romance films based on actual events
Indian romance films
2010s Malayalam-language films
2017 romance films